Vardanyan, also spelled Vardanean or Vardanian, and in Western Armenian spelled Vartanian, is an Armenian surname, from the Armenian given name Vardan and Vartan with the addition of -ian.

Persons
Notable people with the surname include:

Vardanyan
(Armenian / Eastern Armenian)
Ani Vardanyan (born 1991), Armenian figure skater
Ara Vardanyan (administrator) (born 1977), executive director of the Hayastan All Armenian Fund
Ara Vardanyan (weightlifter) (born 1974), Armenian weightlifter
Armen Vardanyan (born 1982), Armenian sport wrestler
Ernest Vardanean (born 1980), Moldovan journalist
Gegham Vardanyan (born 1988), Armenian figure skater
Gevork Vartanian (1924−2012), Soviet spy
Greta Vardanyan (born 1986), Armenian powerlifter and Para-alpine skier
Harutyun Vardanyan (born 1970), Armenian footballer
Knarik Vardanyan (1914–1996), Soviet Armenian painter and printmaker
Norayr Vardanyan (born 1987), Armenian weightlifter
Ruben Vardanyan (politician) (born 1968), Armenian businessman
Ruben Vardanyan (wrestler) (1929–1996), Armenian sport wrestler
Yurik Vardanyan (1956−2018), Soviet Armenian weightlifter
Erik Vardanyan (born 2004), insurance broker

Vartanian
(Western Armenian)
Gevork Vartanian, Soviet intelligence officer, known for discovering Operation Long Jump at the 1943 Tehran Conference
Hrag Vartanian, American writer
Mark Vartanian, American professional wrestler
Mariam Vardanian (1864−1941), Armenian activist and revolutionary
Ara Vartanian, Brazilian jeweler
Sylvie Vartan, born Vartanian

Vardanjan
Gurgen Vardanjan, Armenian-Hungarian figure skating coach
Tigran Vardanjan, Hungarian figure skater of Armenian descent

Places
Vardanjan Rural District, in Shahrekord County, Chaharmahal and Bakhtiari Province, Iran
Vardanjan, Iran, a village in Shahrekord County, Chaharmahal and Bakhtiari Province, Iran (aka Vardaniān, Vardangūn and Wardangun)
Vardanjan, Farsan, a village in Farsan County, Chaharmahal and Bakhtiari Province, Iran

See also
Vardan (disambiguation)
Vartan (disambiguation)

Armenian-language surnames